New Zealanders of African descent represent less than 0.3% of New Zealand's population, although the number has been growing substantially since the 1990s.

African immigration to New Zealand has a long history, with the first African immigrants arriving in the country in the late 19th century. In the early 20th century, a small number of African students and professionals came to New Zealand to study or work. In the 1960s and 1970s, larger numbers of African immigrants arrived in New Zealand, including refugees from countries such as Zambia, Uganda, and Zimbabwe. 

Today, African New Zealanders make up a small but growing portion of the New Zealand population. According to the 2018 New Zealand Census, there were 16,890 people in New Zealand who identified as being of African ancestry.

History 
The history of African New Zealanders dates back to the late 19th century, when the first African immigrants arrived in the country. These early immigrants were mostly students and professionals who came to New Zealand to study or work.

In the early 20th century, African immigration to New Zealand remained relatively small, with only a handful of African students and professionals coming to the country each year. In the 1960s and 1970s, however, larger numbers of African immigrants began to arrive in New Zealand, including refugees from countries such as Zambia, Uganda, and Zimbabwe.

In the 1980s and 1990s, African immigration to New Zealand continued to increase with many African immigrants settling in the larger cities of Auckland and Wellington most of the immigrants being refugees, these refugees often arrived with few possessions and had experienced traumatic events in their home countries. Many came from countries in crisis, such as Ethiopia, Rwanda, Somalia, and Zimbabwe, where wars and brutal political regimes had driven thousands from their homes.

Culture 
African New Zealanders are a diverse and multicultural community, with a wide range of experiences and backgrounds. Their cultural traditions and practices are shaped by the diverse countries and regions from which they or their ancestors come, as well as by their experiences living in New Zealand. 

African New Zealanders have a wide variety of cultural practices and traditions, including music, dance, art, food, and dress. Many African New Zealanders participate in cultural events and festivals that celebrate their heritage and traditions, such as the Africa Day Festival, which is held each year in Auckland to celebrate the diversity of African culture.

Notable African New Zealanders 
 Addil Somani (born 1967), Ugandan-born cricketer
 Alan Blake (1922–2010), rugby player of African-American descent
 David Nyika (born 1995), boxer of Ugandan descent
 Devon Conway born 1990, cricketer playing for New zealand
 Gus Nketia (born 1970), Ghanaian-born track and field athlete
 Ibrahim Omer (born 1979), Eritrean-born Member of Parliament for the Labour Party.
 Israel Adesanya (born 1989), Nigerian-born mixed martial artist
 John da Silva (1934–2021), wrestler of Brazilian descent
 Lesley-Anne Brandt (born 1981), South African-born actress
 Mazbou Q (born 1989), UK-born New Zealand-based Nigerian hip hop artist
 Meryl Cassie (born 1984), South African-born actress
 Nneka Okpala (born 1988), athlete of Nigerian descent
 Precious McKenzie (born 1936), South African-born weightlifter
 Tamupiwa Dimairo (born 1996), Zimbabwean-born footballer
Tawanda Manyimo (born 1981), Zimbabwean-born Actor
 Terefe Ejigu (born 1988), Ethiopian-born long-distance runner
 Kwabena Appiah (born 1992), footballer

See also

 List of ethnic origins of New Zealanders
 Immigration to New Zealand

References

Bibliography
 African Youth Health and Well-Being: Participatory Action Research Project. Evolve and Victoria University, 2005.

 
 
New Zealand